Richard David Namwandi (born February 28, 1954) is a Namibian politician and academic. He served as the Minister of Education from 2013 to 2015 and is the founder of the International University of Management (IUM). He is a member of SWAPO, Namibia's ruling party.

Biography
Namwandi was born at Okapya near Ondangwa in former Ovamboland (today the Oshana Region of Namibia). He holds an MBA and a doctoral degree. In 1994, Namwandi founded the International University of Management (IUM), the first private university in Namibia, with one lecturer and one student. He served as vice-chancellor of IUM from 2001 to 2010 and was succeeded by his wife, Virginia Namwandi.

Namwandi entered parliament in 2010. He was appointed Deputy Minister of Education in 2010 and, after the death of Abraham Iyambo in 2013, promoted to minister. He served until 2015.

Namwandi is a recipient of Lifetime Achievement Award from the Chartered Institute of Management Accountants.

Sources

References

External links
 Official website International University of Management

1954 births
Living people
People from Oshana Region
SWAPO politicians
Education ministers of Namibia